KSHD-LP (94.3 FM, "K-Shady") is a low-power radio station broadcasting a Variety music format. Licensed to Shady Cove, Oregon, United States, the station is currently owned by City of Shady Cove.

References

External links
 

SHD-LP
SHD-LP
SHD-LP